Crinolamia is a genus of medium-sized sea snails, marine gastropod mollusks in the family Eulimidae.

Species
The species within this genus include the following:
 Crinolamia angustispira (Bouchet & Warén, 1986)
 Crinolamia dahli (Bouchet & Warén, 1979)
 Crinolamia edwardiensis (Watson, 1880)
 Crinolamia kermadecensis (Knudsen, 1964)
 Crinolamia ptilocrinicola (Bartsch, 1909)

References

 Warén, A. (1984). A generic revision of the family Eulimidae (Gastropoda, Prosobranchia). Journal of Molluscan Studies. suppl 13: 1-96 page(s): 38
 Bouchet P. & Warén A. (1979). The abyssal molluscan fauna of the Norwegian Sea and its relation to other faunas. Sarsia 64: 211-243
 Bouchet, P. & Warén, A., 1986. Revision of the northeast Atlantic bathyal and abyssal Aclididae, Eulimidae, Epitoniidae. Bollettino Malacologico: 297-576, sér. Suppl.2

External links
 To World Register of Marine Species

Eulimidae